The list of aircraft carriers of the Soviet Union and Russia includes all aircraft carriers built by, proposed for, or in service with the naval forces of either the Soviet Union or Russia. Although listed as aircraft carriers, none of them (with the exception of the never-built Ulyanovsk) is a "true" aircraft carrier (supercarrier). Specifically, they were all ASW helicopter carriers or aircraft cruisers, including the Admiral Kuznetsov, the only carrier still in service with the Russian Navy. Russia is currently considering building a supercarrier, code-named Project Shtorm.

See also 
 Project 1153 OREL
 Project 23000E
 List of aircraft carriers
 List of aircraft carriers in service
 List of aircraft carriers by country
 Timeline for aircraft carrier service
 List of aircraft carriers by configuration

References

External links
 Prospective aircraft carrier (In Russian)
 Aircraft Carriers
 INS Vikramaditya Aircraft Carrier

 
 
Russia
Aircraft carrier
Russian Naval Aviation